7000 series may refer to:

Japanese trains 
 Chichibu Railway 7000 series electric multiple unit (EMU)
 Echizen Railway 7000 series EMU
 Hankyu 7000 series EMU
 Hokushin Kyuko Electric Railway 7000 series EMU operating for the Kobe Municipal Subway
 Hokuso 7000 series
 HOT7000 series DMU
 IGR 7000 series EMU
 Joshin 7000 series EMU
 JR Shikoku 7000 series
 Keio 7000 series EMU
 Keihan 7000 series EMU
 Kintetsu 7000 series EMU
 Meitetsu 7000 series EMU
 Nagoya Municipal Subway 7000 series EMU
 Nankai 7000 series EMU, operated by Nankai Electric Railway
 Nishitetsu 7000 series EMU
 Odakyu 7000 series LSE EMU
 Semboku 7000 series EMU
 Sotetsu 7000 series EMU
 Sapporo Municipal Subway 7000 series
 Toei 7000 series tramcars operated in Tokyo
 Tokyo Metro 7000 series EMU
 Tokyu 7000 series EMU

Korean trains
 SMRT 7000 series, operated by Seoul Metropolitan Rapid Transit Corporation

US trains
 Chicago "L" 7000-series
 Washington Metro 7000-Series

Other
 7000-series highways, a series of highway designations in the Canadian province of Ontario
 Dell Inspiron 7000 series laptop computers
 IBM 7000 series, discrete transistor digital computers in the late 1950s and 1960s
 Navistar 7000 series military vehicles
 Radeon HD 7000 Series of AMD graphics processing units
 AMD Radeon RX 7000 Series of graphics processing units